Selimpaşa, known in Byzantine times as Epibates (sometimes as Epivates or Epibatos), is a small town in the European part of Turkey, near Silivri in Istanbul Province.

Selimpaşa today is a summer resort with long sandy beaches.

The town is the native place of the Orthodox saint Paraskevi and was populated mostly by Greeks until the population exchange in the 1920s.

References

Populated places in Istanbul Province
Seaside resorts in Turkey
Fishing communities in Turkey
Former_Greek_towns_in_Turkey
Neighbourhoods of Silivri
Towns in Turkey